Spiceworks is a professional network for the information technology (IT) industry that is headquartered in Austin, Texas. The company was founded in January 2006 by Scott Abel, Jay Hallberg, Greg Kattawar, and Francis Sullivan to build IT management software.

Spiceworks is an online community where users can collaborate and seek advice from one another, and also engage in a marketplace to purchase IT-related services and products. The network is estimated to be used by more than six million IT professionals and 3,000 technology vendors.

The company's free proprietary software is written in Ruby on Rails, and runs exclusively on Microsoft Windows. The software discovers IP-addressable devices and includes help desk functionality and an integrated knowledge base.

History

Founding
The company was formed in January 2006 by Scott Abel, Jay Hallberg, Greg Kattawar and Francis Sullivan, former executives at Motive. The group had originally gathered in 2005, envisioning a social methodology in which to do IT.

Spiceworks Acquisition
Ziff Davis completed the acquisition of Austin, Texas-based Spiceworks in September 2019. They joined forces to bring together Ziff Davis B2B’s rich content, data, and performance marketing capabilities with Spiceworks’ product and community expertise, ultimately delivering new insights for technology professionals, greater intent-driven market and account intelligence for technology brands, and new experiences that will connect both parties when they need it most.

Funding
The company received $5 million in series A funding from Austin Ventures in June 2006. Spiceworks' series B funding round was completed in August 2007 and included $8 million from Shasta Ventures and Austin Ventures. The company's $18 million series C funding round in January 2010 was headed by Institutional Venture Partners. In April 2011, Spiceworks received $25 million in series D funding from Adams Street Partners and Tenaya Capital  and a 2014 series E financing round worth $57 million led by Goldman Sachs.

Software
In July 2006, it released a public beta. The 1.0 version of Spiceworks was released in November 2006. It focussed on simplifying the process of taking inventory, monitoring networks, and generating reports for IT professionals at small and medium-sized businesses. By the end of its first year, Spiceworks had 120,000 users.

The company released the 2.0 version of its software in December 2007. Subsequent versions followed, leading up to version 7.0 in 2013. The company released  a free network monitor product in December 2014.

In June 2021, Spiceworks Desktop 7.5, became unavailable for download, and at the end of the year, end of life. The company released Cloud Help Desk solution.

European expansion
In 2012, it opened its European headquarters in London, England.

Tenth anniversary
The company celebrated its tenth anniversary in January 2016 and announced plans to add 100 additional employees during the year. However, those plans were changed and in June 2016 the company announced that it was laying off approximately 12 percent of its workforce. In addition to the layoffs, several employees in leadership positions at Spiceworks left the company to join former CEO Scott Abel in founding a new startup, Resly Labs. Resly Labs later changed their name to Umuse.

Business model
Spiceworks offers its professional network and software free to users. The company generates most of its revenue through the sale of ads displayed on its network.  A small percentage of its revenue is generated through purchases of IT products and services  made through the Spiceworks platform.

Corporate identity

Mascot
The official mascot for Spicework is "SpiceRex." SpiceRex is an orange Tyrannosaurus rex. The creation was a result of Spiceworks community member, IT pro, and blogger Andy "akp982" Phelps.

Spiceworld

Austin
Spiceworks has hosted SpiceWorld, a conference for its users, every year since 2008. The conference was originally held at the Alamo Drafthouse movie theater. The conference later moved to the AT&T Executive Education & Conference Center at the University of Texas. Starting with SpiceWorld 2013 and on, the conferences have been held at the Austin Convention Center.

London
With a growing international community, Spiceworks opened up a London office in 2012. The first SpiceWorld London took place in May 2012 in Vinopolis in London's Bankside.

Spiceworld 2020
Spiceworld hosted its first virtual event in the year 2020 to overcome the pandemic challenge. This is well received by the overall IT community where they participated and engaged well. Spiceworld 2020 had more than 3000 participants. This was held from 15th September to 17th September.

Spiceworld 2021
Due to pandemic, it's the second year in a row where Spiceworld was conducted online. The key-note speaker for Spiceworld 2021 was Steve Wozniak. This annual event was conducted from September 27th - 29th, 2021.

Awards and recognition
 2007 – PC Magazine's Editors' Choice award
 2007 – IT Solution of the Year by InnoTech Conference
 2009 – Spiceworks named InformationWeek Startup 50 Company.
 2009 – Spiceworks named "Top 10 B-to-B Web Site" by BtoB Magazine
 2010 – Spiceworks wins PCMag.com Best of 2010 Award
 2010 – Spiceworks wins six Windows IT Pro Editors’ Best and Community Choice Awards

See also
 Comparison of help desk issue tracking software
 Comparison of network monitoring systems
 System administration

References

Companies based in Austin, Texas
Computer companies established in 2006
System administration
American companies established in 2006